Kentucky Route 1958 (KY 1958) is a  state highway in Clark County, Kentucky, that serves as a bypass route around Winchester. It is split into two segments, one on the west side of Winchester and the second on the east side.

Route description
From KY 627, the eastern segment of KY 1958 heads clockwise around Winchester to Kentucky Route 89. The western segment, KY 1958 starts at KY 627 and follows the highway clockwise around the perimeter of the city to KY 2888 a short distance from the I-64 interchange.

Officially, KY 1958 begins on the east side of Winchester at KY 627 and runs clockwise around to KY 2888 on the northwest side, using concurrences on KY 89, US 60, and KY 627 to connect the eastern and western segments. However, the concurrencies are unsigned and the eastern segment's signed cardinal directions are opposite of those on the official log.

History
The western bypass was originally a connector route between I-64, Van Meter Road, Rockwell Road and US 60, but was extended south and southeast to KY 627 south of the city and, later, to its present terminus north of Winchester.

In 2006, the eastern Winchester bypass opened from KY 627 just south of Interstate 64 to KY 89. It will be extended westward to the western bypass, making for a semi-loop around the city.

Major intersections

Western segment

Eastern segment

References

External links
 

1958
Transportation in Clark County, Kentucky